Yawarqucha (Quechua yawar blood, qucha lake, "blood lake", Hispanicized spelling Yahuarcocha) is a mountain in the Andes of Peru,  high. It is located in the Junín Region, Yauli Province, Morococha District. It lies northeast of Yuraqqucha. The peak east of Yawarqucha is named Miyu (Quechua for "poison", also spelled Mio).

References

Mountains of Peru
Mountains of Junín Region